Eggel is a river of North Rhine-Westphalia, Germany. It is a left tributary of the Diemel. Its lower section defines the boundary between North Rhine-Westphalia and Hesse.

See also
List of rivers of North Rhine-Westphalia
List of rivers of Hesse

References

Rivers of Hesse
Rivers of Germany